The 129th New York State Legislature, consisting of the New York State Senate and the New York State Assembly, met from January 3 to May 3, 1906, during the second year of Frank W. Higgins's governorship, in Albany.

Background
Under the provisions of the New York Constitution of 1894, 50 Senators and 150 assemblymen were elected in single-seat districts; senators for a two-year term, assemblymen for a one-year term. The senatorial districts were made up of entire counties, except New York County (twelve districts), Kings County (seven districts), Erie County (three districts) and Monroe County (two districts). The Assembly districts were made up of contiguous area, all within the same county, .

At this time there were two major political parties: the Republican Party and the Democratic Party. In New York City, the Municipal Ownership League also nominated candidates.

Elections
The New York state election, 1905, was held on November 7. No statewide elective offices were up for election this time. Special elections were held to fill the vacancies in the 16th and 24th senatorial districts.

Sessions
The Legislature met for the regular session at the State Capitol in Albany on January 3, 1906; and adjourned on May 3.

James Wolcott Wadsworth, Jr. (R) was elected Speaker with 106 votes against 34 for George M. Palmer (D) and 6 for Thomas F. Long (M.O.L.).

On April 27, the Legislature re-apportioned the Senate districts, increasing the number to 51. The apportionment was then contested in the courts.

The Legislature also re-apportioned the number of assemblymen per county. Nassau County was separated from the remainder of Queens County; Albany, Broome, Cattaraugus, Cayuga, Onondaga, Oswego and Rensselaer counties lost one seat each; Erie, Monroe and Westchester gained one each; and Kings and Queens counties gained two each.

On August 13, the new Senate apportionment was upheld by Supreme Court Justice Howard.

On April 3, 1907, the new Senate and Assembly apportionment was declared unconstitutional by the New York Court of Appeals.

State Senate

Districts

Note: In 1897, New York County (the boroughs of Manhattan and Bronx), Kings County (the borough of Brooklyn), Richmond County (the borough of Staten Island) and the Western part of Queens County (the borough of Queens) were consolidated into the present-day City of New York. The Eastern part of Queens County (the non-consolidated part) was separated in 1899 as Nassau County. Parts of the 1st and 2nd Assembly districts of Westchester County were annexed by New York City in 1895, and became part of the Borough of the Bronx in 1898.

Members
The asterisk (*) denotes members of the previous Legislature who continued in office as members of this Legislature.

Employees
 Clerk: Lafayette B. Gleason
 Sergeant-at-Arms: Charles R. Hotaling
 Assistant Sergeant-at-Arms: Everett Brown
 Stenographer: James C. Marriott

State Assembly

Assemblymen

Employees
 Clerk: Archie E. Baxter
 Assistant Clerk: Ray B. Smith
 Sergeant-at-Arms: Frank W. Johnston
 Stenographer: Henry C. Lammert

Notes

Sources
 Official New York from Cleveland to Hughes by Charles Elliott Fitch (Hurd Publishing Co., New York and Buffalo, 1911, Vol. IV; see pg. 351ff for assemblymen; and 365f for senators)
 ODELL CLINCHES GRIP ON THE ASSEMBLY in NYT on November 9, 1905
 WADSWORTH NAMED BY 75 CAUCUS VOTES in NYT on January 3, 1906 [States erroneously that "Wadsworth will be the youngest Speaker the Assembly has ever had." The youngest Speaker ever was Edmund L. Pitts in 1867.]
 WADSWORTH'S FIRST DAY BRINGS FIGHT ON RULES in NYT on January 4, 1906
 SHAKE-UP BY WADSWORTH STIRS ASSEMBLY WRATH in NYT on January 11, 1906

129
1906 in New York (state)
1906 U.S. legislative sessions